The flower festival or flower sprinkling festival (known in Tamil as Poochoriyal) is an important festival celebrated in the Samayapuram Mariamman temple near Tiruchirappalli, India. This festival is usually held in the Tamil month of Masi. During this festival, devotees throng the temple to sprinkle flowers on the idol of the Hindu goddess Mariamman. During this period, it is believed, that the goddess fasts for the welfare of her devotees for a period of 28 days. As a result, the ritual consecration of food at the temple does not take place.

References 

 

Tamil festivals
Flower festivals in India
Culture of Tiruchirappalli